Oskars Cibuļskis (born April 9, 1988) is a Latvian professional ice hockey defenceman who is currently an unrestricted free agent. He most recently played under contract with Brynäs IF in the Swedish Hockey League (SHL).

Playing career
Cibuļskis began his professional career in 2004, when he played for the Latvian Hockey league club SK Rīga 18, which is the base club for Latvian U18 national team. He spent the next three seasons in SK Rīga 20, which, respectively, is the base club for the Latvian U20 national team. In 2005-06 he also played two games in HK Rīga 2000 and played in the Belarusian Extraleague.

In the 2007–08 season, Cibuļskis signed with Austrian league team, EC Red Bull Salzburg of the EBEL. After compiling 12 points in 52 games, Oskars returned to his native land for the following 2009–10 season, when he signed with Dinamo Riga of the KHL, on August 21, 2009.

On May 18, 2017, Cibuļskis left Riga, signing an initial one-year contract with Czech outfit Mountfield HK of the ELH.

After four seasons in the Czech Extraliga, Cibuļskis returned as a free agent for a second stint with Dinamo Riga of the KHL on 1 May 2021.

International play
Oskars has played for Latvia in the 2005 and 2006 division 1 World U18 Championships, getting promoted to the top U18 division in 2006. He also played in the 2007 and 2008 division I IIHF World U20 Championships. The team earned a promotion to the top U20 division in 2008.

Career statistics

Regular season and playoffs

International

References

External links

 

1988 births
Brynäs IF players
Dinamo Riga players
Living people
Latvian ice hockey defencemen
HC Litvínov players
Stadion Hradec Králové players
Ice hockey people from Riga
EC Red Bull Salzburg players
Ice hockey players at the 2022 Winter Olympics
Olympic ice hockey players of Latvia
Rytíři Kladno players
Latvian expatriate ice hockey people
Latvian expatriate sportspeople in the Czech Republic
Latvian expatriate sportspeople in Austria
Latvian expatriate sportspeople in Sweden
Expatriate ice hockey players in Sweden
Expatriate ice hockey players in the Czech Republic
Expatriate ice hockey players in Austria